Colonel Lotfi Stadium is a multi-use stadium in Tlemcen, Algeria.  It is currently used mostly for football matches and is the home ground of WA Tlemcen.  The stadium holds 18,000 people.

Algeria national football team matches

The Stade Akid Lotfi has hosted four games of the Algeria national football team, against Qatar in 1989, Burundi in 1992, Ghana in 1993, and the Ivory Coast in 1993.

References

External links
 Stadium file - goalzz.com

Colonel Lotfi Stadium
Buildings and structures in Tlemcen Province